Alliance for Croatia was a right-wing electoral alliance in Croatia. The aim of the coalition was the joint appearance of smaller right-wing parties in the 2014 European Parliament elections and 2014–2015 Croatian presidential elections. The coalition was dissolved in 2015.

The coalition consisted of:
 Croatian Democratic Alliance of Slavonia and Baranja 
 Croatian Party of Rights 
 Croatian Dawn – Party of the People 
 Authentic Croatian Peasant Party 
 Family Party 
 Action for a Better Croatia 
 A Vow for Croatia 
 Croatian Growth dissidents

In the European Parliament elections in 2014 the coalition received 6.88% of the vote. Although they passed the threshold of 5%, they did not win a seat. In the presidential elections later that year, their candidate Milan Kujundžić finished fourth with 6.30% of the vote.

References

Defunct political party alliances in Croatia
2014 establishments in Croatia
Political parties established in 2014
Croatian nationalist parties
Defunct nationalist parties in Croatia